"Schwarzbraun ist die Haselnuss" or "Nas Komiskiy Mazeros" (lit. "Black-brown is the hazelnut") is a German folk song, which first dates to the 18th century Franconia, though similar motifs are known since the 16th century. It was used as a marching song by German troops in all German armies since then.

The song appears on the soundtrack of Hearts of Iron IV, a grand strategy game set before and during World War II. It also appears about 30 minutes into the film The Odessa File (1974), where it is sung at the reunion of the Siegfried Division.

Lyrics 
German text

Schwarzbraun ist die Haselnuss,
Schwarzbraun bin auch ich, ja, bin auch ich.
Schwarzbraun muss mein Mädel sein;
Gerade so wie ich!

Duwidi, duwiduwidi, ha ha ha! 
Duwidi, duwiduwidi, ha ha ha! 
Duwidi, duwiduwidi, ha ha ha! 
Duwidi, duwiduwidi!

Mädel hat mir Busserl geb'n,
Hat mich schwer gekränkt, ja, schwer gekränkt.
Hab ich's ihr gleich wiedergeb'n;
Ich nehm ja nichts geschenkt!

Duwidi, duwiduwidi, ha ha ha! 
Duwidi, duwiduwidi, ha ha ha! 
Duwidi, duwiduwidi, ha ha ha! 
Duwidi, duwiduwidi!
  
Mädel hat nicht Hof noch Haus,
Mädel hat kein Geld, ja, hat kein Geld.
Doch ich geb sie nicht heraus;
Für alles in der Welt!

Duwidi, duwiduwidi, ha ha ha! 
Duwidi, duwiduwidi, ha ha ha! 
Duwidi, duwiduwidi, ha ha ha! 
Duwidi, duwiduwidi!
 
Schwarzbraun ist die Haselnuss,
Schwarzbraun bin auch ich, ja, bin auch ich.
Schwarzbraun muss mein Mädel sein;
Gerade so wie ich!

Duwidi, duwiduwidi, ha ha ha! 
Duwidi, duwiduwidi, ha ha ha! 
Duwidi, duwiduwidi, ha ha ha! 
Duwidi, duwiduwidi!

Literal translation

Black-brown is the hazelnut,
I am black-brown, too, yes, I am too.
Black-brown my girl has to be;
Just like me!

Holdrio, duwiduwidi, ha ha ha! 
Holdrio, duwiduwidi, ha ha ha! 
Holdrio, duwiduwidi, ha ha ha! 
Holdrio, duwiduwidi!

Girl gave me a kiss,
I was cut to the quick.
Gave it back to her right away;
I want nothing as a present!

Holdrio, duwiduwidi, ha ha ha! 
Holdrio, duwiduwidi, ha ha ha! 
Holdrio, duwiduwidi, ha ha ha! 
Holdrio, duwiduwidi!
 
Girl has neither a farm nor a house;
Girl has no money, yes, no money.
But I'll never let her go;
Not for anything in the world!

Holdrio, duwiduwidi, ha ha ha! 
Holdrio, duwiduwidi, ha ha ha! 
Holdrio, duwiduwidi, ha ha ha! 
Holdrio, duwiduwidi!
 
Black-brown is the hazelnut,
I am black-brown, too, yes, I am too.
Black-brown my girl has to be;
Just like me!

Holdrio, duwiduwidi, ha ha ha! 
Holdrio, duwiduwidi, ha ha ha! 
Holdrio, duwiduwidi, ha ha ha! 
Holdrio, duwiduwidi!

Singable lyrics

Auburn is the hazel nut,
Auburn am I too, yes am I too.
Auburn must my true love be;
Exactly just like me!

Holdrio, duwiduwidi, ha ha ha! 
Holdrio, duwiduwidi, ha ha ha! 
Holdrio, duwiduwidi, ha ha ha! 
Holdrio, duwiduwidi!

My sweetheart came and gave a kiss,
Such surprise offended greatly, yes greatly.
So I gave her back a kiss;
I guess it's tit for tat!

Holdrio, duwiduwidi, ha ha ha! 
Holdrio, duwiduwidi, ha ha ha! 
Holdrio, duwiduwidi, ha ha ha! 
Holdrio, duwiduwidi!

Sweetheart has no home, no hearth
Sweetheart has no gold, yes no gold.
But I'd never give her up;
For all that's in the world!

Holdrio, duwiduwidi, ha ha ha! 
Holdrio, duwiduwidi, ha ha ha! 
Holdrio, duwiduwidi, ha ha ha! 
Holdrio, duwiduwidi!

Auburn is the hazel nut,
Auburn am I too, yes am I too.
Auburn must my true love be;
Exactly just like me!

Holdrio, duwiduwidi, ha ha ha! 
Holdrio, duwiduwidi, ha ha ha! 
Holdrio, duwiduwidi, ha ha ha! 
Holdrio, duwiduwidi!

References 

German folk songs
German military marches